10 is a 2022 Kannada Language film directed by Karm Chawla and starring Vinay Rajkumar in the role of a boxer, Gopal Deshpande as the coach and Anusha Raghunath. The film is a sport drama exploring the life and struggles of a boxer. 10 was announced in May 2019 and the shooting commenced in September 2019, wrapping just three months later in December 2019. It was made with a budget of INR 70 lakhs, and the production budget amounted to just under INR 50 lakhs, thus setting the stone for a new generation of high quality low-budget Kannada flicks. Before the commencement of principal photography, actor Vinay Rajkumar trained intensely for his role as a Featherweight Boxer by having regular workouts and strict diet regimen for six months.

Plot 

The film is a look into the life of a boxer - Vijay Kumar who is accused of doping charges. He believes the culprit behind these changes is his coach who he has a frictional relationship with. Ultimately his struggle and journey along with his love Shruti, his coach and his manager is what the film portrays.

Cast 
 Vinay Rajkumar as Vijay Kumar
 Anusha Ranganath as Shruthi
 Gopal Krishna Deshpande as Pradeep Gowda
 Suvin Hegde as Shetty

Release and reception 

After experiencing numerous delays and financial constraints following the COVID-19 pandemic, 10 had a small theatrical release on the 16th of Dec, 2022 with minimal publicity and promotions. A week later it was released on the streaming platform Amazon Prime.

Sree Vardhan Vellala for Deccan Herald wrote "One also wonders why the movie is named ‘10’. Except for the protagonist’s jersey number, the number 10 has nothing much to do as far the film’s theme or its conflicts are concerned."

Times of India wrote "Sports dramas are predictable and Ten is no different. Like every film from that genre, Ten also speaks about the formulaic rise, fall, and rise of the hero. However, what is missing is the edge-of-the-seat adrenaline rush that such films provide. However, the parallels between a coach and student’s life and how a coach tries and fails to salvage his student’s career has been showcased well."

A Sharadhaa of Cinema Express rated 3 out of 5 stars and wrote "Karm Chawla’s film has above-average writing and direction, and hits the required highs, and delivers killer punches at the right moments."

References 

2020s Kannada-language films
Indian sports drama films
2022 films